The Lambing Flat is the first novel by Australian author Nerida Newton; it was first published in 2003. She has since written a second novel, Death of a Whaler.

The novel is set in the mid-nineteenth century Australian gold rushes.

The main characters are:
Ella, the daughter of a grazier, who grew up on an isolated, drought-ridden Queensland property.
Lok and his father who come from China in search of gold.  They are caught up in the infamous Lambing Flat riots.

External links 
Nerida Newton's Home Page

2003 Australian novels
Historical novels
Novels set in New South Wales
Fiction set in 1860
Fiction set in 1861
2003 debut novels